This is a list of newspapers in Saint Vincent and the Grenadines.

Weekly 
The News
The Vincentian
Searchlight

Daily 

 The Herald

Other 
 SVG Express
 The VincyView

See also
Lists of newspapers

References 

Saint Vincent and the Grenadines
Newspapers

Newspapers